Janie Bradford (born June 2, 1939 in Charleston, Missouri, United States) is an American songwriter, most known for her tenure with Motown. With Berry Gordy, she co-wrote "Money (That's What I Want)", originally recorded by Barrett Strong, and then by The Beatles on their second album With The Beatles. "Money" is also on The Rolling Stones' first UK EP (January 17, 1964).

Other hits by Bradford include "Too Busy Thinking About My Baby" by Marvin Gaye (although originally by The Temptations), and also recorded by Phil Collins, "Contract On Love" by Little Stevie Wonder and "Your Old Standby" for Mary Wells. She worked at Motown for more than 25 years.

Currently, Bradford is the executive director of the Janie Bradford HAL Scholarship Fund and producer of the Heroes And Legends a.k.a. HAL Awards, an annual event that raises funds for performing arts scholarships while paying tribute to entertainment legends, including many of Motown's biggest stars.  She has also established Twinn Records with songwriter and singer Marilyn McLeod.

References

External links
  AllMusic | Record Reviews, Streaming Songs, Genres & Bands
 

Songwriters from Missouri
Motown artists
Living people
American women songwriters
1939 births
People from Charleston, Missouri
21st-century American women